Porea Elisa (born 1955) is an international lawn bowler from the Cook Islands.

Bowls career
Elisa won the bronze medal in the triples at the 1995 Asia Pacific Bowls Championships in Dunedin. Twelve years later she won double bronze in the singles and triples at the Asia Pacific Championships in Christchurch.

She was selected to represent the Cook Islands at the 2006 Commonwealth Games and 2010 Commonwealth Games.

References

External links
 
 

1955 births
Living people
Bowls players at the 2006 Commonwealth Games
Bowls players at the 2010 Commonwealth Games
Commonwealth Games competitors for the Cook Islands
Cook Island female bowls players